Gramathu Athiyayam is a 1980 Indian Tamil-language film directed by C. Rudhraiya. The film stars Nandakumar, Sundar and Swarnalatha.

Plot

Cast 
Chandrahasan
Nandakumar
Krishnakumari
Sundar
Swarnalatha

Production 
Gramathu Athiyayam was the second and final film to be directed by C. Rudhraiya after Aval Appadithan (1978). Jayabharathi who went on to direct films like Kudisai and Uchi Veyil was initially selected as lead actor even Kamal Haasan was also speculated for lead role since he was "in London for a month for a K. Balachander film" he was replaced by a newcomer Nandakumar. Saritha was also initially chosen as lead actress before she also got replaced.

Soundtrack 
The soundtrack was composed by Ilaiyaraaja, with lyrics written by Gangai Amaran.

Release 
Gramathu Athiyayam was released on 19 September 1980.

References

External links 
 

1980 films
1980s romance films
1980s Tamil-language films
Films scored by Ilaiyaraaja
Indian romance films